The 2022 Commonwealth Heads of Government Meeting, also known as CHOGM 2022, was the 26th Meeting of the Heads of Government of the Commonwealth of Nations. The meeting was originally scheduled for 26–27 June 2020 in Kigali, Rwanda preceded by various fora between 22 and 25 June, but was postponed twice due to the COVID-19 pandemic.  On 31 January 2022, it was announced that the meeting would be held on 24 and 25 June 2022 and the pre-meeting fora held from 20 to 23 June.

Charles, Prince of Wales represented the Head of the Commonwealth, Queen Elizabeth II, at the summit. The Queen died less than three months later, on September 8, 2022.

Background
The Commonwealth Heads of Government Meeting (CHOGM) is a pivotal agenda-setting and decision-making space for the diverse community of 56 Commonwealth countries. The 2022 CHOGM was scheduled to be held in Rwanda. It was the first Commonwealth Summit  held in a country that is not a former British colony or dominion or the United Kingdom itself.

On 8 May 2021, the CHOGM was postponed by President Paul Kagame of Rwanda and Commonwealth secretary-general Patricia Scotland a second time due to the COVID-19 pandemic.

On 31 January 2022, Kagame and Scotland announced that the CHOGM will be held in the week of 20 June 2022, following agreement by all member countries of the Commonwealth.

Attendees
Of the 53 Commonwealth member countries, 50 countries sent an official representative while 3 countries - Grenada, Kiribati and Nauru did not send any official representative or delegation. 14 countries were represented by their respective heads of state including the reigning monarchs from Brunei and Eswatini, 18 countries by their respective heads of government, 4 countries by their respective deputy heads of state or deputy heads of government, 10 countries by ministerial representatives while 4 countries sent their respective diplomats or special envoys. The Commonwealth was represented by the Prince of Wales on behalf of Queen Elizabeth II, the head of the Commonwealth and by Patricia Scotland, the Secretary-General of the Commonwealth. 

Maldives, represented by its President Ibrahim Mohamed Solih attended its first summit since re-joining the Commonwealth in 2018. 

 Prince Charles, Prince of Wales representing Queen Elizabeth II, Head of the Commonwealth
 Patricia Scotland, Secretary-General of the Commonwealth
 Gaston Browne, Prime Minister of Antigua and Barbuda
 Richard Marles, Deputy Prime Minister of Australia
 Philip Davis, Prime Minister of the Bahamas
 AK Abdul Momen, Minister of Foreign Affairs of Bangladesh
 Kerrie Symmonds, Minister of Foreign Affairs and Foreign Trade of Barbados
 Johnny Briceño, Prime Minister of Belize
 Mokgweetsi Masisi, President of Botswana
 Sultan Hassanal Bolkiah, Sultan and Prime Minister of Brunei
 Joseph Ngute, Prime Minister of Cameroon
 Justin Trudeau, Prime Minister of Canada
 Ioannis Kasoulides, Minister of Foreign Affairs of Cyprus
 Roosevelt Skerrit, Prime Minister of Dominica
 King Mswati III, King of Eswatini
 Jitoko Tikolevu, High Commissioner of Fiji to the United Kingdom
 Badara Joof, Vice President of The Gambia
 Nana Akufo-Addo, President of Ghana
 Mohamed Irfaan Ali, President of Guyana
 Dr. S. Jaishankar, Minister of External Affairs of India
 Andrew Holness, Prime Minister of Jamaica
 Uhuru Kenyatta, President of Kenya
 Moeketsi Majoro, Prime Minister of Lesotho
 Nancy Tembo, Minister of Foreign Affairs of Malawi
 Dato' Sri Saifuddin Abdullah, Minister of Foreign Affairs of Malaysia
 Ibrahim Mohamed Solih, President of the Maldives
 Chris Fearne, Deputy Prime Minister of Malta
 Pravind Jugnauth, Prime Minister of Mauritius
 Adriano Maleiane, Prime Minister of Mozambique
 Hage Geingob, President of Namibia
 Nanaia Mahuta, Minister of Foreign Affairs of New Zealand
 Muhammadu Buhari, President of Nigeria
 Hina Rabbani Khar, Minister of State for Foreign Affairs of Pakistan
 Winnie Kiap, High Commissioner of Papua New Guinea to the United Kingdom
 Paul Kagame, President of Rwanda (Chair)
 Philip J. Pierre, Prime Minister of Saint Lucia
 Camillo Gonsalves, Minister of Finance, Economic Planning and Information Technology of Saint Vincent and the Grenadines
 Fiamē Naomi Mataʻafa, Prime Minister of Samoa
 Wavel Ramkalawan, President of the Seychelles
 Julius Maada Bio, President of Sierra Leone
 Lee Hsien Loong, Prime Minister of Singapore
 Colin Beck, Permanent Secretary for Foreign Affairs and External Trade of the Solomon Islands
 Naledi Pandor, Minister of International Relations and Cooperation of South Africa
 Professor G. L. Peiris, Minister of Foreign Affairs of Sri Lanka
 Philip Mpango, Vice President of Tanzania
 Siaosi Sovaleni, Prime Minister of Tonga
 Amery Browne, Minister of Foreign and CARICOM Affairs of Trinidad and Tobago
 Simon Kofe, Minister of Justice, Communications and Foreign Affairs of Tuvalu
 Yoweri Museveni, President of Uganda
 Boris Johnson, Prime Minister of the United Kingdom
 Georges Maniuri, Ambassador of Vanuatu to Europe
 Hakainde Hichilema, President of Zambia

Agenda
In his speech at the opening ceremony, Charles, Prince of Wales said that the decision for Commonwealth realms as to whether to remain a monarchy, or become a republic, were purely a matter for each member country to decide, and suggested that changes can be made "calmly and without rancour".

The position of Commonwealth Chair-in-Office, held by the government leader of the CHOGM host country, was transferred at the summit from the Prime Minister of the United Kingdom to the President of Rwanda, who will hold the post until the 27th CHOGM to be held in Samoa and which was initially scheduled for 2022.

The theme for the meeting was 'Delivering A Common Future: Connecting, Innovating, Transforming'. Five sub-themes have been identified for discussion: Governance and Rule of Law, ICT & Innovation, Youth, Environment and Trade. Leaders discussed ways the contemporary Commonwealth can transform societies, in accordance with Commonwealth Charter values of democracy, multilateralism, sustainable development, and empowerment of women and youth.

Ahead of the meeting, ministers of parliament, youth and gender activists, and representatives from civil society and commerce convened special forums to ensure the consideration of key concerns and perspectives of women, young people, businesses and non-governmental organisations in leaders' decision-making.

Environment 
Commonwealth leaders and senior officials expressed support for a non-binding charter on climate change, biodiversity and land degradation.

Small states 
Ministers discussed ways of improving the resilience of small states, resulting in several Commonwealth nations being declared "Commonwealth Small States Advocacy Champions whose role is to galvanise support for the Advocacy Strategy" and the "Launch of the Commonwealth Virtual Centre for Small States (VCSS), a tailor-made platform which connects Commonwealth Small States Offices in New York, Geneva and the Commonwealth Secretariat."

Women's rights and safety 
The Commonwealth Women's Forum discussed actions for promoting gender equality. The Commonwealth Secretariat and the NO MORE foundation launched new guidelines for combatting violence against women and girls within the Commonwealth.

Youth 
Youth delegates presented a series of recommendations for Commonwealth heads of government, including increased taxes on industrial polluters and more support for youth-led start-up businesses.

Secretary-General election
There was an attempt by the United Kingdom to deny Patricia Scotland a second term as Commonwealth Secretary-General The British government rejected an attempt in 2020 to automatically appoint Scotland to a second term and has reportedly lost confidence in her due to allegations about her leadership style and spending while in office. Kenyan defence minister Monica Juma was nominated in August 2021 for the position of Secretary-General by Kenyan president Uhuru Kenyatta. She withdrew her candidacy in February 2021, saying she did not want her candidacy to further divide the Commonwealth.

In April 2022, Jamaica nominated its foreign minister, Kamina Johnson Smith, as a candidate for Secretary-General, prompting criticism from other Caribbean states that are backing Lady Scotland's re-election.

Tuvalu had proposed its former governor-general, Sir Iakoba Italeli, for the post of secretary general – the first time a Pacific nation has sought the role.

Lady Scotland was re-elected to a second term, reportedly defeating Johnson Smith by 27 votes to 24, with Italeli having withdrawn. As her first term had been extended by two years due to the pandemic and the postponement of the 2020 CHOGM, Scotland promised that she will only serve for two more years instead of a full four-year term.

Human Rights in Rwanda
The Commonwealth Human Rights Initiative, Human Rights Watch, and Freedom House have all found that the protection of democracy and human rights in Rwanda have declined since the country joined the Commonwealth in 2009. There have been calls for the Commonwealth to stand up for democracy and human rights in Rwanda at the 2022 CHOGM.

Such calls have included for Commonwealth governments to pressure CHOGM 2022 host Rwanda to free human rights defender Paul Rusesabagina. The UN Working Group on Arbitrary Detention found on 18 March 2022 that he had been illegally kidnapped, tortured, and sentenced after an unfair trial. The Working Group stated that: "It is clear on the facts that Mr. Rusesabagina has been targeted by the Government on account of his work as a human rights defender, because of his criticism of the Government on a broad range of human rights issues, including unfair elections and a lack of democracy, freedom of speech, freedom of association and freedom of the press. He has also challenged cases of arbitrary detention, torture and extrajudicial killings.’’ The Working Group called on the Government “to release Mr. Rusesabagina immediately and accord him an enforceable right to compensation and other reparations, in accordance with international law’’ and “to ensure a full and independent investigation of the circumstances surrounding the arbitrary deprivation of liberty of Mr. Rusesabagina and to take appropriate measures against those responsible for the violation of his rights.”

Rusesabagina’s family welcomed the Working Group’s finding, and were “hopeful that the world will listen to this call by the United Nations and put pressure on Rwanda to immediately free our father and husband”.

Togo and Gabon

Togo and Gabon joined the Commonwealth, despite never having been under British rule.

References

1989
Diplomatic conferences in Rwanda
21st-century diplomatic conferences (Commonwealth)
Commonwealth Heads of Government Meeting
Commonwealth Heads of Government Meeting
Commonwealth Heads of Government Meeting
Commonwealth Heads of Government Meeting
Commonwealth Heads of Government Meeting
Commonwealth Heads of Government Meeting
Rwanda and the Commonwealth of Nations
Commonwealth Heads of Government Meeting, 2021